The wedding dress of Princess Margaret, the sister of Queen Elizabeth II, was worn at her wedding to photographer Antony Armstrong-Jones on 6 May 1960 at Westminster Abbey.

The dress
The wedding dress was designed by Norman Hartnell, the favoured couturier of the royals, and was made from silk organza. The skirt comprised some 30 metres of fabric. Hartnell specifically kept the adornments of the dress such as the crystal embellishments and beading to a minimum in order to suit Margaret's petite frame.

The dress now belongs to the British Royal Collection and is part of a display of royal wedding dresses at Kensington Palace in London.

Critical appraisal
Vogue described the dress as "stunningly tailored". Another author called it "a study in simplicity". In 1960, Life magazine named it "the simplest royal wedding gown in history". It has also been described as one of Hartnell's most beautiful and sophisticated pieces.

See also
 List of individual dresses

References

External links
BBC audio slideshow featuring her wedding dress

1960 works
Margaret
House of Windsor
British royal attire
1960s fashion
Margaret, Wedding
Princess Margaret, Countess of Snowdon